Tommy McGee (born 9 July 1979 in Thurso, Scotland) is a Scottish former rugby union footballer for Leeds Tykes. His usual position is at prop. McGee was released by Leeds in 2010 and later that year was appointed head coach of Wharfedale. He has previously represented Scotland and Great Britain students at rugby league.

Notes

External links
 Leeds player profile

1979 births
Living people
Leeds Tykes players
Rugby league players from Thurso
Rugby union players from Thurso
Rugby union props
Scotland 'A' international rugby union players
Scottish rugby league players
Scottish rugby union players
Wharfedale R.U.F.C. players